Nelida "Nellie" Pou (born May 20, 1956; pronounced "Poe") is an American Democratic Party politician who has served in the New Jersey Senate since 2012, representing the 35th Legislative District. She previously represented the 35th district in the General Assembly. When Pou was sworn into the Assembly on January 29, 1997, to succeed Bill Pascrell, she became the first woman and the first Hispanic to represent the 35th district.

Pou serves in the senate as the Majority Caucus Chair.

Education
Pou attended Kean College, Rutgers University, and the University of Virginia.

Career 
Pou has spent most of her career at the City of Paterson, where she has served as business administrator (2014–18), assistant business administrator (2003–2014, 1997–1998), director of human services (1986–1997), and CETA training and education coordinator (1975–1983).

Currently, she is a project Ccordinator for the Paterson Parking Authority.

She also served on the New Jersey Task Force on Child Abuse and Neglect (1997–2016) and on the Passaic-Bergen County HIV Health Services Advisory Council (1993–1997). She was the coordinator of the Passaic County Youth Program from 1983 to 1985.

New Jersey General Assembly 
Pou was appointed to a vacant seat in the New Jersey General Assembly on January 29, 1997. The seat had previously been held by Bill Pascrell, who had served in the General Assembly since 1988. Pascrell resigned from his position after winning election to the U.S. House of Representatives, to which he was sworn in on January 3, 1997. She was the Assembly's Deputy Speaker from 2002–2005 and the Assistant Minority Leader from 2000–2001.

In the Assembly Pou served on the Appropriations Committee (as Chair from 2006-2011), the Budget Committee, the Education Committee and the Joint Budget Oversight Committee. Previously, Pou served on the Senior Issues Committee (as Chair), the Appropriations Committee (as Vice Chair) and the Education Committee.

New Jersey Senate 
Pou elected not to run for re-election to her Assembly seat in 2011, instead choosing to run for the State Senate seat from the district that long-time incumbent John Girgenti was vacating. She defeated former Haledon, New Jersey mayor Ken Pengitore in the general election and was sworn in as Senator in January 2012. In March 2021, Pou secured her party's nomination to run in the 2021 New Jersey State Senate election.

New Jersey Legislative Latino Caucus 
Pou has chaired the bicameral New Jersey Legislative Latino Caucus since 2006.

Committees 
Committee assignments for the current session are:
Commerce, Chair
Judiciary, Vice-Chair
Joint Committee on Economic Justice and Equal Employment Opportunity

District 35 
Each of the 40 districts in the New Jersey Legislature has one representative in the New Jersey Senate and two members in the New Jersey General Assembly. The representatives from the 35th District for the 2022—23 Legislative Session are:
 Senator Nellie Pou  (D)
 Assemblywoman Shavonda E. Sumter  (D)
 Assemblyman Benjie E. Wimberly  (D)

Election history

References

External links
Senator Pou's legislative web page, New Jersey Legislature
New Jersey Legislature financial disclosure forms
2014 2013 2012 2011 2010 2009 2008 2007 2006 2005 2004
Assembly Member Nellie Pou, Project Vote Smart

1956 births
American people of Cuban descent
Living people
Democratic Party members of the New Jersey General Assembly
Democratic Party New Jersey state senators
People from North Haledon, New Jersey
Politicians from Paterson, New Jersey
University of Virginia alumni
Women state legislators in New Jersey
21st-century American politicians
21st-century American women politicians